Aleksandr Vasilivich Nemits, (Russian: Нёмитц, Александр Васильевич; 26 July 1879 – 1 October 1967) was a naval officer of Russian Empire, Ukrainian State and Soviet Union. He was commander of the Soviet Navy between February 1920 and November 1921.

Nemits was born in Moldavia, the son of a military judge. He finished the Naval academy in 1899 and joined the Black Sea Fleet he served as assistant to the Naval attache to Turkey and as a gunnery officer. Following the mutinies of 1905 he served as a defence lawyer for the mutineers and managed to spare them from the death penalty.

From 1907 he served on the Navy general staff and commanded the gunboat Donets. subsequently he commanded a destroyer division and held various staff posts. In 1917 he married Anastasia the sister of the artist Mikhail Vrubel. In 1917 he was promoted to rear admiral and commanded the Black Sea Fleet. In this role on 23 November 1917 he asked the Ukrainian People's Republic to take the fleet under his jurisdiction. On 30 September 1918 the Ukrainian State appointed Nemits as their Minister of Marine. Later in 1918 he joined the Red Navy and fought in the civil war where he was wounded.

In February 1920 he replaced Yevgeniy Berens as commander of the Soviet Navy. From 1924 he was in charge of all Soviet naval and air force academies. He retired in 1947 and lived in Sevastopol.

References

site in Russian

1879 births
1967 deaths
People from Briceni District
People from Bessarabia Governorate
Imperial Russian Navy officers
Russian military personnel of World War I
Ukrainian admirals
Soviet military personnel of the Russian Civil War
Soviet admirals
Recipients of the Order of Lenin
Recipients of the Order of the Red Banner